George Bryant may refer to:

George Bryant (actor) (1862–1943), Australian actor in the silent era
George Bryant (archer) (1878–1938), American Olympic archer 
George Bryant (baseball) (1857–1907), American baseball player
George E. Bryant (1832–1907), American politician and general
George W. Bryant (1873–1947), American football coach for the Virginia Military Institute Keydets, 1895–1896
George Bryant (New Zealand politician) (born 1938), New Zealand writer, politician and theologian